Mickey's Speedway USA is a Disney racing game for the Nintendo 64 and Game Boy Color, developed by Rareware and published by Nintendo under license from Disney Interactive. It is styled after other kart racers such as Mario Kart 64 and Diddy Kong Racing, and features characters from the Mickey Mouse universe racing across the United States. It is Rare and Nintendo's second Disney-themed racing game following Mickey's Racing Adventure (1999).

Gameplay

Mickey's Speedway USA features various characters from the Mickey Mouse universe racing in karts to complete laps around a track as quickly as possible. Scattered along each track are tokens that increase racers' maximum speed, boosters which will give racers a quick burst of acceleration, and items that can be used to interfere with opponents, such as baseballs and paint cans. The Nintendo 64 (N64) version features gameplay similar to Rare's previous N64 racing game Diddy Kong Racing, while the Game Boy Color (GBC) version uses a top down gameplay style similar to its predecessor, Mickey's Racing Adventure.

The game includes a Grand Prix mode, a time trial mode, a practice mode, and multiplayer racing modes in both the N64 and GBC versions, along with a multiplayer battle mode on N64. Completing each Grand Prix on different difficulties will unlock new characters, cheats, and other features. The game features 20 different race tracks spread across five Grands Prix, all themed after famous American cities and locations such as Los Angeles, Washington, D.C., and the Grand Canyon; the selection of tracks slightly differs between versions. An additional bonus track can be unlocked in the N64 version via a cheat code and in the GBC version by linking up to a copy of Mickey's Racing Adventure via the system's infrared port.

Six playable characters are included in both versions of the game. These default characters are paired in statistics: Mickey and Donald have average statistics, Minnie and Daisy focus on handling and acceleration, and Goofy and Pete have a concentration in speed and quickness. Three additional characters, consisting of Dewey, Louie, and Ludwig Von Drake, can be unlocked in the N64 version through completing objectives in Grand Prix mode; a fourth character, Huey, can only be unlocked by connecting to the GBC version through the Transfer Pak.

Synopsis
Mickey discovers his dog, Pluto, has been kidnapped by the Weasels for his diamond collar. He calls Minnie, Donald, Daisy and Goofy to help search for him, while Pete intercepts the phone call and follows behind. Professor Ludwig von Drake builds race cars for the group to help them search faster, and they travel across America following a series of postcards left by the Weasels. After a final race, the Weasels are found, caught, and sent to jail. Mickey happily reunites with Pluto, revealing the supposed diamonds on his collar are simply glass beads from one of Minnie's old necklaces, and the group heads home.

Reception

The Nintendo 64 version received "average" reviews according to video game review aggregator Metacritic.

Matthew Byrd, writing for Den of Geek in 2017, said: "To be honest, Mickey's Speedway USA doesn't quite measure up to the likes of Diddy Kong Racing, Mario Kart 64, or Crash Team Racing. Its courses are not nearly as inventive (many are just basic recreations of US locations), its power-ups are a little slim, its A.I. is perpetually stuck in first, and its roster is a bit thin (...) [but] Rare still managed to produce an engagingly charming and more than functional kart racing title that's only notable flaws are tied into the fact that it didn't surpass what came before it".

See also
List of Disney video games

References

External links
Official Nintendo Japan Mickey's Speedway USA site

2000 video games
Disney video games
Donald Duck video games
Game Boy Color games
Games with Transfer Pak support
Goofy (Disney) video games
Kart racing video games
Mickey Mouse video games
Multiplayer and single-player video games
Nintendo games
Nintendo 64 games
Racing video games
Rare (company) games
Vehicular combat games
Video games developed in the United Kingdom
Video games set in Alaska
Video games set in Arizona
Video games set in Boston
Video games set in California
Video games set in Chicago
Video games set in Colorado
Video games set in Florida
Video games set in Hawaii
Video games set in Indianapolis
Video games set in Los Angeles
Video games set in Louisiana
Video games set in Milwaukee
Video games set in Montana
Video games set in Nebraska
Video games set in New Mexico
Video games set in New Orleans
Video games set in New York City
Video games set in Oregon
Video games set in Philadelphia
Video games set in San Francisco
Video games set in Seattle
Video games set in Tennessee
Video games set in Texas
Video games set in the Las Vegas Valley
Video games set in Utah
Video games set in Washington, D.C.
Video games set in Wyoming
Video games set on the Moon